The 1967–68 Ohio State Buckeyes men's basketball team represented Ohio State University. The team's head coach was Fred Taylor.

NCAA basketball tournament
Mideast 
Ohio State 79, East Tennessee State 72
Ohio State 82, Kentucky 81
Final Four
North Carolina 80, Ohio State 66

Awards and honors
 Bill Hosket, First-Team All Big Ten

Team players drafted into the NBA

References

Ohio State Buckeyes men's basketball seasons
NCAA Division I men's basketball tournament Final Four seasons
Ohio State
Ohio State
Ohio State Buckeyes
Ohio State Buckeyes